Alejandra Herrera may refer to:
 Alejandra Herrera (actress), Chilean actress
 Alejandra Herrera (footballer), Salvadoran footballer